The Forthing SX6 is a Midsize Crossover sport utility vehicle positioned above the Forthing S500 MPV produced by Dongfeng Liuzhou Motor under the Forthing (Dongfeng Fengxing) sub-brand, and it officially debuted in July 2016.

Overview

The SX6 is a seven-seater in a 2-2-3 seating configuration with prices ranging from 69,900 yuan to 102,900 yuan. Two engines are available for the Fengxing SX6, including a 1.6 liter engine producing 117hp and 150nm, and a 2.0 liter engine producing 138hp and 200nm. The 1.6 liter engine is mated to a five-speed manual gearbox or a CVT, and the 2.0 liter engine is only available with the five-speed manual gearbox. No automatic box is offered for the Fengxing SX6. The 1.6 liter engine codenamed 4A9 is sourced from Mitsubishi and the 2.0 liter engine is sourced from PSA.

References

External links
Fengxing SX6 Official website

Compact MPVs
Crossover sport utility vehicles
2010s cars
Fengxing SX6
Cars introduced in 2016
Front-wheel-drive vehicles
Cars of China